Kawano (written: 河野, 川野 or かわの in hiragana) is a Japanese surname. Notable people with the surname include:

, Japanese footballer
, Japanese footballer
, Japanese game designer, game director and writer
, Japanese artist, known for wood blocks
, Japanese volleyball player
, Japanese footballer
, Japanese admiral
, keyboardist for Japanese jazz fusion band T-Square
, Japanese footballer
Koichiro Kawano (born 1981), Japanese golfer
, Japanese actor and musician
, Japanese voice actor
, Japanese footballer
, Japanese footballer
Yosh Kawano (1921-2018), Chicago Cubs clubhouse manager

See also
Kawano Station, a railway station in Suzuka, Mie Prefecture, Japan

Japanese-language surnames